Svenska Serien 1915–16, part of the 1915–16 Swedish football season, was the sixth Svenska Serien season played. IFK Göteborg won the league ahead of runners-up AIK.

League table

References 

Print

Online

1915-16
Sweden
1